Andrés Isasi Linares (1890 in Bilbao – 1940) was a Basque composer. He studied with Engelbert Humperdinck in Germany and was better known there than in Spain. He was made a citizen of honour of Getxo district of Greater Bilbao.

Recordings
 Spanish Classics — Andrés Isasi Symphony No. 2 Suite No. 2 Bilbao Symphony Orchestra, Juan José Mena Naxos
 Andrés Isasi : String Quartets : Volumes 1,2,3. Isasi Quartet. Naxos
 Isasi: Orchestral Works: Berceuse Tragica for Violin and Orchestra Op.22 No.1. Erotic Poem Op.14. Zharufa Op.12. El Oráculo Op. 18. El Pecado Op.19 John Carney (violin) Basque National Orchestra, Enrique Garcia Asensio. Claves.
 Songs on Basque songs Carlos Mena. HMF

References

Basque classical composers
1890 births
1940 deaths
20th-century classical composers
Spanish classical composers
Male classical composers
People from Bilbao
20th-century Spanish musicians
20th-century French male musicians
Spanish male musicians